Michael Binkley is a fictional character in Berke Breathed's cartoon strip Bloom County.

Michael, known to all simply as 'Binkley,' is a 10-year-old boy who lives at the Bloom County Boarding House with his father Tom (his mother, Margret, had divorced Tom and moved to Oakland with a Hells Angel).

Binkley is in the same class as Milo Bloom, his best friend. Binkley introduces Opus to his group, at first believing him to be a dog. Binkley is described as "an airhead" by everyone who knows him (except Opus). Binkley is the first recurring child character after Milo to appear in the strip and largely replaced the dog Rabies as Milo's sounding board.

Binkley originally appears as a player on Milo's elementary school football team.  The coach is Major Bloom, who uses the team to live out his fantasy of being a great military commander.  Binkley is originally depicted as a stereotypical nerd; he is much smaller than the other children and has thick glasses, bad skin, and messy hair.  Soon afterwards, Binkley appears in his "classic" look (Opus at one point comments that Binkley looks like a carrot).  Binkley's father initially calls him "Mad Dog" and hopes he will live out his failed dreams by becoming a star middle linebacker.  Binkley, on the other hand, is interested in ballet, wants to dance the lead in Swan Lake, and dreams of being a hairdresser. He is a Star Wars fan and dreams of being a master Jedi.

He constantly wakes up his easily irritated father in the middle of the night to talk to him about celebrity gossip, politics and random anxieties to the point where the father eventually cannot sleep without those interruptions. He also has a closet in his room where his anxieties dwell and plague him at night. Their leader is the Giant Purple Snorklewacker, but the anxieties can range from typical things like giant snakes to computer technology to politically themed ones like a pair of disagreeing macroeconomists. In one instance, the anxiety closet showed Binkley his future middle-aged self: a balding, paunchy, lifelong failure who gives grandiose nicknames to his wife, daughter, house, car, dog, etc. Binkley is infatuated with an African American girl named Blondie (scandalizing the rather conservative townsfolk, including his father). Binkley campaigns with the Meadow Party.

In the Sunday strip Opus, it is revealed that Binkley had become a eunuch in Tibet after a disastrous first date. However, Binkley makes a sudden and unexplained reappearance in the June 3, 2007 Opus strip in which he is depicted in his "classic" incarnation.

References

Binkley, Michael
Binkley, Michael